Luís Miguel Fraga de Magalhães Mota (born 14 September 1974) is a Portuguese futsal coach and former futsal player who played as a winger. He is the head coach of the Portuguese II Divisão club Freixieiro. As a player Mota won two Portuguese futsal leagues with Miramar and played for the Portugal national team in the 1999 Euros and the 2000 World Cup.

References

External links

1974 births
Living people
Sportspeople from Porto
Portuguese men's futsal players
AR Freixieiro players